Botany Bay is a hamlet in Enfield, England, on the outskirts of north London, located within the London Borough of Enfield. It has a population close to 200. The hamlet is centred at the junction of The Ridgeway – the A1005 road that links Enfield to Potters Bar and the M25 motorway – and East Lodge Lane. Enfield Chase lies to the south and west. It is about a mile from the railway station at Crews Hill.  

Botany Bay was established when Enfield Chase was enclosed in 1777 and was recorded as Botany Bay on C.G. Greenwood's map of 1819. According to the Dictionary of London Place Names its name references Botany Bay in Australia, transferred to the hamlet which was "remote and inaccessible in the middle of Enfield Chase." The place name is repeated in several counties within England.

Botany Bay amenities include The Robin Hood public house, a farm shop, a business centre, a cricket ground and club, and a chapel. Botany Bay is served by Transport For London bus route 313, which runs 7 days a week, linking the location to Potters Bar, Enfield and Chingford. 

The hamlet is part of the Chase ward of the London Borough of Enfield, which also covers Crews Hill, Clay Hill and Bulls Cross. The 2011 census showed that 77% of the ward's population was white (64% British, 11% Other, 2% Irish), 5% was Black African and 3% Black Caribbean.

There was a small primary school in the hamlet. In the early 1950s pupils were bused from Hadley Wood to Botany Bay for their schooling.

References

External links
 

Areas of London
Places in Enfield, London
Districts of the London Borough of Enfield
Places formerly in Middlesex